Vaux is an impact crater in the Oxia Palus quadrangle of Mars.  It was named by the IAU in 1976 after Vaux, a town in France.

Vaux lies within Ares Vallis.

References 

Impact craters on Mars
Oxia Palus quadrangle